The Best Job in the World may refer to:
 The Best Job in the World, 1996 film
 The Best Job in the World (advertising), a 2009 advertising campaign